In granular mechanics, the μ(I) rheology is one model of the rheology of a granular flow.

Details

The inertial number of a granular flow is a dimensionless quantity defined as

where  is the shear rate tensor,  is its magnitude, d is the average particle diameter, P is the isotropic pressure and ρ is the density. It is a local quantity and may take different values at different locations in the flow. 

The μ(I) rheology asserts a constitutive relationship between the stress tensor of the flow and the rate of strain tensor:

where the eponymous μ(I) is a dimensionless function of I. As with Newtonian fluids, the first term -Pδij represents the effect of pressure. The second term represents a shear stress: it acts in the direction of the shear, and its magnitude is equal to the pressure multiplied by a coefficient of friction μ(I). This is therefore a generalisation of the standard Coulomb friction model. The multiplicative term  can be interpreted as the effective viscosity of the granular material, which tends to infinity in the limit of vanishing shear flow, ensuring the existence of a yield criterion.

One deficiency of the μ(I) rheology is that it does not capture the hysteretic properties of a granular material.

Development

The μ(I) rheology was developed by Jop et al. in 2006.

References

Rheology
Granularity of materials